Novopodkletnoye is a rural locality (a village) in Yamenskoye Rural Settlement, Ramonsky District, Voronezh Oblast, Russia. The population was 493 as of 2010. There are 147 streets.

Geography 
Novopodkletnoye is located 33 km southwest of Ramon (the district's administrative centre) by road. Pervozvanny is the nearest rural locality.

References 

Rural localities in Ramonsky District